Nucinellidae is a family of bivalves, in the order Solemyida. Its species are small and principally reside in deep-water environments. The family's characteristic features include large gills and reduced palps and their appendages; oval shells with few hinge teeth; they possess a single adductor muscle and one divided foot exhibiting papillae. The family contains two known genera: Huxleyia and Nucinella. Speaking of Nucinella, the genus' ligament system is of the simple arched type, lacking nymphae. Regarding the former, the system is "submerged" beneath its dorsal margin.

Genera and species
Huxleyia (Adams, 1860)
Huxleyia cavernicola (Hayami & Kase, 1993)
Huxleyia concentrica (Verco, 1907)
Huxleyia diabolica (Jousseaume, 1897)
Huxleyia habooba (Oliver & Taylor, 2012)
Huxleyia munita (Dall, 1898)
Huxleyia pentadonta (Scarlato, 1981)
Huxleyia sulcata (Adams, 1860)
Nucinella (Wood, 1851)
Nucinella adamsii (Dall, 1898)
Nucinella boucheti (La Perna, 2005)
Nucinella dalli (Hedley, 1902)
Nucinella giribeti (Glover & Taylor, 2013)
Nucinella kanekoi (Matsukuma, Okutani & Tsuchi, 1982)
Nucinella maoriana (Hedley, 1904)
Nucinella maxima (Thiele, 1931)
Nucinella ovalis (Wood, 1840)
Nucinella owenensis (Oliver & Taylor, 2012)
Nucinella pretiosa (Gould, 1861)
Nucinella serrei (Lamy, 1912)
Nucinella subdola (Strong & Hertlein, 1937)
Nucinella surugana (Matsukuma, Okutani & Tsuchi, 1982)
Nucinella viridis (Matsukuma, Okutani & Tsuchi, 1982)
Nucinella viridula (Kuznetzov & Schileyko, 1984)

References

Further reading

La Perna, Rafael. "A gigantic deep-sea Nucinellidae from the tropical West Pacific (Bivalvia: Protobranchia)." Zootaxa 881 (2005): 1-10.

External links

WORMS

 
Bivalve families